Beharaj is a town and union council of Gujrat District, in the Punjab province of Pakistan.

External links
info

Populated places in Gujrat District
Union councils of Gujrat District